The Australasian Society for Experimental Psychology was incorporated in Western Australia in 1997 as a learned society for experimental psychologists .  Its membership is based primarily in Australia and New Zealand. Its main function is to organise an annual conference, the Experimental Psychology Conference.

The society served to formalize the organization of the conference, first held in 1974.

As of 2006, the society has had one permanent executive member: Professor David Badcock as its Registered Public Officer. The remainder of the executive each year are the members of that year's conference organizing committee. Professor Badcock coordinates the activities of the society, including finding the next year's organizing committee chairperson. People who register for the conference become members of the society for that year.

See also 
 List of learned societies

References

External links
 http://www.asep.com.au/

Psychology organisations based in Australia
1997 establishments in Australia